Man and Superman is a four-act drama written by George Bernard Shaw in 1903. The series was written in response to a call for Shaw to write a play based on the Don Juan theme. Man and Superman opened at the Royal Court Theatre in London on 21 May 1905 as a four-act play produced by the Stage Society, and then by John Eugene Vedrenne and Harley Granville-Barker on 23 May, without Act III ("Don Juan in Hell"). A part of the third act, Don Juan in Hell (Act 3, Scene 2), was performed when the drama was staged on 4 June 1907 at the Royal Court. The play was not performed in its entirety until 1915, when the Travelling Repertory Company played it at the Lyceum Theatre, Edinburgh.

Summary 
Mr. Whitefield has recently died, and his will indicates that his daughter Ann should be left in the care of two men, Roebuck Ramsden and John Tanner. Ramsden, a venerable old man, distrusts John Tanner, an eloquent youth with revolutionary ideas, whom Shaw's stage directions describe as "prodigiously fluent of speech, restless, excitable (mark the snorting nostril and the restless blue eye, just the thirty-secondth of an inch too wide open), possibly a little mad". In spite of what Ramsden says, Ann accepts Tanner as her guardian, though Tanner does not want the position at all. She also challenges Tanner's revolutionary beliefs with her own ideas. Despite Tanner's professed dedication to anarchy, he is unable to disarm Ann's charm, and she ultimately persuades him to marry her, choosing him over her more persistent suitor, a young man, Tanner's friend, named Octavius Robinson.

List of characters 
 Hector Malone, Sr., an elderly gentleman who has worked hard throughout his life to attain a high social status in which he now takes pride.
 Ann Whitefield, a young woman, graceful, somewhat enigmatic. She corresponds to the character Doña Ana in the Don Juan myth (in Act III, Shaw's stage direction refers to Doña Ana de Ulloa as "so handsome that in the radiance into which her dull yellow halo has suddenly lightened one might almost mistake her for Ann Whitefield").
 Henry Straker, chauffeur with a cockney accent (representing Leporello from the Mozart opera).
 John Tanner, also called "Jack Tanner", a well-educated, well-spoken man who takes everything seriously, including himself; a "political firebrand and confirmed bachelor." Allegedly the descendant of Don Juan, as well as the modern representation of the Don Juan character (in Act III, Shaw notes Don Juan's resemblance to Tanner: "Besides, in the brief lifting of his face, now hidden by his hat brim, there was a curious suggestion of Tanner. A more critical, fastidious, handsome face, paler and colder, without Tanner’s impetuous credulity and enthusiasm, and without a touch of his modern plutocratic vulgarity, but still a resemblance, even an identity"). The very name "John Tanner" is an anglicisation of the Spanish name "Juan Tenorio", which is the full name of Don Juan. 
 Violet Robinson, sister of Octavius Robinson. She has been secretly married to Hector Malone, Jr.
 Mrs. Whitefield, mother of Ann, and widow of the late Mr. Whitefield.
 Susan Ramsden, the spinster sister of Roebuck Ramsden.
 Hector Malone, Jr., an American gentleman who is secretly married to Violet Robinson.
 Octavius Robinson, an amiable young man who is in love with Ann Whitefield. Brother to Violet Robinson. He represents "Don Ottavio" from the Don Juan myth.
 Roebuck Ramsden, an aging civil reformer who was friend to the late Mr. Whitefield. He corresponds to the statue in the Don Juan myth, who is in turn the representation of the spirit of Don Gonzalo, the father of Doña Ana (in Act III, Shaw writes of The Statue, "His voice, save for a much more distinguished intonation, is so like the voice of Roebuck Ramsden").
 Mendoza, an anarchist who collaborates with Tanner. Mendoza is the "President of the League of the Sierra," a self-described brigand and a Jew. He corresponds to Shaw's conception of the Devil as he would be portrayed in the Don Juan myth (Shaw writes of "The Devil" in Act III: "A scarlet halo begins to glow; and into it the Devil rises, very Mephistophelean, and not at all unlike Mendoza, though not so interesting").

Interpretation and performances

Don Juan Play 
The long third act of the play, which shows Don Juan himself having a conversation with several characters in Hell, is often cut. Charles A. Berst observes of Act III:

Paradoxically, the act is both extraneous and central to the drama which surrounds it. It can be dispensed with, and usually is, on grounds that it is just too long to include in an already full-length play. More significantly, it is in some aspects a digression, operates in a different mode from the rest of the material, delays the immediate well-made story line, and much of its subject matter is already implicit in the rest of the play. The play performs well without it.

Don Juan in Hell consists of a philosophical debate between Don Juan (played by the same actor who plays Jack Tanner), and the Devil, with Doña Ana (Ann) and the Statue of Don Gonzalo, Ana's father (Roebuck Ramsden) looking on. This third act is often performed separately as a play in its own right, most famously during the 1950s in a concert version, featuring Charles Boyer as Don Juan, Charles Laughton as the Devil, Cedric Hardwicke as the Commander and Agnes Moorehead as Doña Ana. This version was also released as a spoken word album on LP, but is yet to appear on CD. In 1974–1975, Kurt Kasznar, Myrna Loy, Edward Mulhare and Ricardo Montalbán toured nationwide in John Houseman's reprise of the production, playing 158 cities in six months.

Ideas 
Although Man and Superman can be performed as a light comedy of manners, Shaw intended the drama to be something much deeper, as suggested by the title, which comes from Friedrich Nietzsche's philosophical ideas about the "Übermensch" (although Shaw distances himself from Nietzsche by placing the philosopher at the very end of a long list of influences). As Shaw notes in his "Epistle Dedicatory" (dedication to theatre critic Arthur Bingham Walkley) he wrote the play as "a pretext for a propaganda of our own views of life". The plot centres on John Tanner, author of "The Revolutionist's Handbook and Pocket Companion", which is published with the play as a 58-page appendix. Both in the play and in the "Handbook" Shaw takes Nietzsche's theme that mankind is evolving, through natural selection, towards "superman" and develops the argument to suggest that the prime mover in selection is the woman: Ann Whitefield makes persistent efforts to entice Tanner to marry her yet he remains a bachelor. As Shaw himself puts it: "Don Juan had changed his sex and become Dona Juana, breaking out of the Doll's House and asserting herself as an individual". This is an explicit, intended reversal of Tirso de Molina's play The Trickster of Seville and the Stone Guest, more widely known as the source of Da Ponte's Don Giovanni; here Ann, representing Doña Ana, is the predator – "Don Juan is the quarry instead of the huntsman," as Shaw notes.

Ann is referred to as "the Life Force" and represents Shaw's view that in every culture, it is the women who force the men to marry them rather than the men who take the initiative. Sally Peters Vogt proposes: "Thematically, the fluid Don Juan myth becomes a favorable milieu for Creative Evolution", and that "the legend ... becomes in Man and Superman the vehicle through which Shaw communicates his cosmic philosophy".

Productions 
In 1917 the Abbey Theatre produced the play for 7 performances. The production was directed by J. Augustus Keogh.

In 1925 the Abbey Theatre produced the play for 7 performances. The production was directed by Michael J. Dolan.

In 1927 the Abbey Theatre produced the play for 7 performances. The production was directed by Lennox Robinson.

In 1946. the BBC Third Programme broadcast the entire play for the first time. The production was directed by Peter Watts. It starred John Garside, Leonard Sachs, Sebastian Shaw, Grizelda Hervey amongst others.

In 1968 the BBC adapted the play for television as a Play of the Month. Only a short sequence from this play still exists.

In 1977–1978 the RSC produced the play at London's Savoy Theatre.

In 1981, London's National Theatre staged a production, with the "Don Juan in Hell" act included, directed by Christopher Morahan and starring Daniel Massey as Jack Tanner and Penelope Wilton as Ann Whitefield.

In 1982, a television version with Peter O'Toole in the starring role and Barry Morse as The Devil was first broadcast in the United Kingdom.

In 1990, South Coast Repertory in Costa Mesa, California staged a production, with the "Don Juan in Hell" act included, directed by Martin Benson and starring John de Lancie as Jack Tanner and his wife Marnie Mosiman as Ann Whitefield.

In 1996, to celebrate BBC Radio 3's 50th Anniversary, Sir Peter Hall directed an audio production with Ralph Fiennes as Jack Tanner, Judi Dench as Mrs. Whitefield, John Wood as Mendoza, Juliet Stevenson as Ann Whitefield, Nicholas Le Provost as Octavius Robinson and Jack Davenport as Hector Malone.

In 2012, the Irish Repertory Theatre and Gingold Theatrical Group presented a revival directed and adapted by David Staller.

In 2015, London's National Theatre staged a production, with the "Don Juan in Hell" act included, directed by Simon Godwin and starring Ralph Fiennes as Jack Tanner and Indira Varma as Ann Whitefield.

In 2019 Canada's Shaw Festival staged the full production with Martha Burns as Mendoza/The Devil, Gray Powell as Jack Tanner and Sara Topham as Ann.

References

External links 

 
 Man and Superman, an audio rendition of the play.
 Man and Superman, digitized copy of the first edition from Internet Archive.
 
 Review, photos and other information
 Read online at Project Gutenberg
 " The Revolutionist's Handbook and Pocket Companion", an appendix to Man and Superman (page images)
 " Old Time Radio".  MP3 downloads of 1950 performance.

1903 plays
Plays by George Bernard Shaw
Fiction about the Devil
Works based on the Don Juan legend